Vadnais Heights is a city in Ramsey County, Minnesota, United States. The population was 12,302 at the 2010 census.

Geography
It borders the cities of Shoreview, Little Canada, White Bear Lake, Maplewood, North Oaks, and Gem Lake.

Interstate 35E, Interstate 694, U.S. Highway 61, and County Highway 96 are four of the main routes in Vadnais Heights.

Climate
Vadnais Heights has a humid continental climate. This hot-summer subtype is typical of south-central Minnesota and includes wet summers and dry cold winters.

Education
White Bear Lake Area Public Schools (ISD 624) serves the majority of the area of Vadnais Heights, with the exception of the northwestern portion of the city served by Mounds View Public Schools (ISD 621).  An elementary school in the White Bear Lake School District, Vadnais Heights Elementary, is located at Centerville Road and County Road E. Contrary to popular belief, the elementary school mascot is a wolf, not a bear. An independent charter school, the Academy for Sciences and Agriculture High School, is located by Vadnais Lake.

Parks and recreation
Including play equipment, trails, hard surface areas, picnic shelters, soccer and softball/baseball fields, hockey and pleasure rinks, basketball and tennis courts, and restrooms.

Vadnais Lake is surrounded by protected land with miles of walking trails. There is no boating or swimming in the lake and fishing is only allowed in designated areas on the southwest side in order to protect the water quality as the lake serves as a water source for the Ramsey County area. It is also a Ducks Unlimited habitat.

Demographics

2010 census
As of the census of 2010, there were 12,302 people, 5,066 households, and 3,340 families residing in the city. The racial makeup of the city was 84.9% White, 3.6% African American, 0.5% Native American, 7.6% Asian, 1.1% from other races, and 2.4% from two or more races. Hispanic or Latino of any race were 2.8% of the population.

There were 5,066 households, of which 29.2% had children under the age of 18 living with them, 52.3% were married couples living together, 9.8% had a female householder with no husband present, 3.8% had a male householder with no wife present, and 34.1% were non-families. 27.5% of all households were made up of individuals, and 9.2% had someone living alone who was 65 years of age or older. The average household size was 2.42 and the average family size was 2.97.

The median age in the city was 41.9 years. 22.3% of residents were under the age of 18; 7.7% were between the ages of 18 and 24; 23.4% were from 25 to 44; 34.2% were from 45 to 64; and 12.3% were 65 years of age or older. The gender makeup of the city was 47.3% male and 52.7% female.

2000 census
As of the census of 2000, there were 13,069 people, 5,064 households, and 3,448 families residing in the city. The racial makeup of the city was 91.67% White,  4.53% Asian, 1.48% African American, 0.46% Native American, 0.47% from other races, and 1.38% from two or more races. Hispanic or Latino was 1.61% of the population.

There were 5,064 households, of which 36.4% had children under the age of 18, 54.2% were married couples living together, 10.5% had a female householder with no husband present, and 31.9% were non-families. 24.8% of all households were made up of individuals, and 6.3% had someone living alone who was 65 years of age or older. The average household had 2.57 people and the average family size was 3.12.

In the city, the distribution of ages was spread out, with 26.9% under the age of 18, 8.6% from 18 to 24, 32.0% from 25 to 44, 24.7% from 45 to 64, and 7.8% who were 65 years of age or older.  The median age was 36 years. For every 100 females, there were 90.9 males. For every 100 females age 18 and over, there were 90.4 males.

The median income for a household in the city was $60,804, and the median income for a family was $74,178. Males had a median income of $48,611 versus $35,102 for females. The per capita income for the city was $30,891.  About 2.5% of families and 3.2% of the population were below the poverty line, including 4.9% of those under age 18 and none of those age 65 or over.

References

External links
 Vadnais Heights, MN – official website

Cities in Ramsey County, Minnesota
Cities in Minnesota